The Tarratine Formation is a geologic formation in Maine. It preserves fossils dating back to the Devonian period.

Description

The Tarratine Formation is part of the larger Gaspe Group which extend from the Gaspe Peninsula to Long Island Sound. The Seboomoook Formation is interpreted as grading into the sandstones of the Tarratine Formation. In the late 20th century, geologists debated the origin of the sandstone in the formation. Some attributed the sand to islands, while geologists in Quebec suggested that the sand resulted from erosion associated with the Acadian Orogeny. The formation is present in the Moose River synclinorium in north-central Maine.

See also

 List of fossiliferous stratigraphic units in Maine
 Paleontology in Maine

References
 

Devonian Maine
Devonian southern paleotemperate deposits